United Nations Security Council Resolution 265, adopted on April 1, 1969, after reaffirming resolution 248, the Council condemned Israel's for its premeditated air attacks on Jordan villages in flagrant violation of the United Nations Charter and cease-fire resolutions and deplored the loss of civilian life and damage to property.

The resolution was adopted by 11 votes to none; Colombia, Paraguay, the United Kingdom and United States abstained from voting.

See also
 Arab–Israeli conflict
 List of United Nations Security Council Resolutions 201 to 300 (1965–1971)

References 
Text of the Resolution at undocs.org

External links
 

 0265
 0265
 0265
1969 in Israel
April 1969 events
 0265